Keter Shem Tov, ("The Crown of the Good Name") was the first published work of the teachings of Rabbi Israel Baal Shem Tov, the founder of Hasidism. The book was published in Zalkevo, 1794, more than thirty years after Rabbi Israel's passing. The book contains numerous, but brief, Hasidic interpretations of the Torah (Hebrew Bible).

The Chabad-Lubavitch Hasidic movement had republished the work in a number of new editions.

Teachings
In Keter Shem Tov, the Baal Shem Tov stresses the importance and esteem placed on the recital of Psalms.

Quotes
 "A mashal (parable) is a vessel for the pure enlightenment of the mind"

Publishing
A complete edition of Keter Shem Tov (titled Keter Shem Tov Hasholeim) was published by the Chabad publishing house, Kehot Publication Society, in 2004. The new edition was edited and annotated by  Rabbi Jacob Immanuel Schochet who recompiled the collection and added annotations, footnotes, cross references and textual corrections.
A Paraphrased Translation of Keter Shem Tov including the Additions Added (collected from the writing of the Chabad Rebbes) by Rabbi Immanuel Schochet was released by Rabbi Zevi Wineberg. in July. 2020.

References

External links
 Keter Shem Tov, 2004 edition, on HebrewBooks.org

1794 non-fiction books
2004 non-fiction books
Hebrew-language religious books
Hebrew words and phrases
Hasidic_literature
Books published posthumously